A. H. M. Khairuzzaman Liton (born 14 August 1959) is a Bangladesh Awami League presidium member who is also the mayor of Rajshahi City Corporation. He got a landslide victory in the 30 July 2018 Rajshahi City Corporation election. As per results of the total 138 polling centres, Liton bagged a total of 1,65,096 votes while his nearest contestant Bulbul got 77, 700 votes.

Early life and education
Liton was born at Kadirganj in Rajshahi District on 14 August 1959. His father, A.H.M. Kamaruzzaman, was one of the national leaders of Bangladesh. He was a student of Rajshahi Collegiate School from class 3 to class 7. In 1976, he passed his HS Exam from Narendrapur Ramkrishna Mission. He completed his bachelor's from the University of Calcutta in English in 1979. He completed Bachelor of Laws from University of Rajshahi in 1983.

Political career
In 1985, Liton became a Bar Council Member. In 1986, he joined Bangladesh Awami League. He took part in the general elections in 1996 and 2001 from the constituency of Rajshahi-2 (Poba-Boalia). He was the president of Rajshahi City Awami League until he was nominated as AL presidium member.

References

1959 births
Living people
People from Rajshahi District
Awami League politicians
University of Calcutta alumni
University of Rajshahi alumni
Mayors of Rajshahi